Mike Daly is a former American football player and coach. He served as the head football coach at South Dakota State University from 1991 to 1996, compiling a record of 40–24.

Head coaching record

College

References

Year of birth missing (living people)
Living people
North Dakota State Bison football coaches
South Dakota State Jackrabbits football coaches
Wisconsin Badgers football coaches
Augustana University alumni